Decisive Battles of WWII: Battles in Normandy is a 2004 computer wargame developed by Strategic Studies Group and published by Matrix Games. It is the third game in the Decisive Battles of WWII series, following The Ardennes Offensive (1997) and Korsun Pocket (2003). A fourth game in the series, Battles in Italy, was released in 2005.

Gameplay
Set in World War II, Battles in Normandy is a turn-based computer wargame that simulates the conflicts between Germany and Allied forces that surrounded Operation Overlord.

Development
The game features a new game engine different from that of earlier Decisive Battles games.

Reception

Bob Proctor reviewed the game for Computer Gaming World, and stated that "it adheres tightly to the point of view of a Corps commander. It gives you data on weather, terrain, unit strength and condition but fails to provide any idea of combat odds or why a particular combat result occurred. You get a feel for this only after many games."

GameSpots Tracy Baker wrote, "Take one of the best operational-level World War II wargame engines ever devised, improve it, and cross it with one of the most compelling campaigns in military history, and you get Battles in Normandy". In Computer Gaming World, Di Luo argued that it "may be the best operational-level computer war game on the market today."

The editors of Computer Gaming World named Battles in Normandy the 2004 "War Game of the Year". They wrote, "This operational-level look at the Normandy campaign is probably the best war game on the market and is a must-have for any war gamer's collection." The game was the winner of the Best 20th Century+ PC Game Charles Roberts Award in 2004. Its release date was 15 September 2004.

Reviews
 Casus Belli #43 (Feb 1988)

References

2004 video games
Strategic Studies Group games
Turn-based strategy video games
Computer wargames
Video games developed in Australia
Windows games
Windows-only games
World War II video games
Matrix Games games
Single-player video games